Mesothen aurata is a moth of the subfamily Arctiinae. It was described by Paul Dognin in 1913. It is found in Colombia.

References

 Natural History Museum Lepidoptera generic names catalog

Mesothen (moth)